The Suleva (or Suliava) is a river of Kėdainiai district municipality, Kaunas County, central Lithuania.

It starts nearby Okainėliai village,  from Pavermenys. It flows southwards mostly through the Lančiūnava-Šventybrastis Forest and meets the Obelis from the right side in Aukštieji Kapliai.

Suleva passes through Milžemiai and Jaskaičiai villages.

The hydronym derives from Lithuanian word sula ('sap', 'juice').

References

Rivers of Lithuania
Kėdainiai District Municipality